AEM or A.E.M. may refer to:

Companies, groups, organizations
  (English: Mexican Space Agency), the national space agency of Mexico
 Agnico Eagle Mines Limited, a Canadian-based gold producer
 Societé d'Application Electro-Mécanique (AEM), manufacturer of the AEM (1924 automobile)
 Association of Equipment Manufacturers, a United States-based trade association
 Automotive Engineering and Manufacturing (AEM), manufacturer of the AEM (1987 automobile)

Engineering, science and technology
 AEM rubber, an ethylene acrylic rubber
 Alkaline earth metal, the 6 chemical elements in group 2 of the periodic table.
 AEM (psychedelic), alpha-ethylmescaline, a psychedelic drug
 Analytic element method, a numerical technique
 Anion exchange membrane, a type of semipermeable membrane used in fuel cells
 Applications Explorer Mission, part of the Explorer program
 Applied and Environmental Microbiology, a scientific research journal
 Applied element method, a method of structural analysis
 Atlantic Equatorial mode, a climate pattern of the tropical Atlantic Ocean

Other uses
 Arem language (ISO 639-3 code: aem), an endangered Austro-Asiatic language of South-East Asia
 AEM (1924 automobile), a French electric car
 AEM (1987 automobile), a Welsh-built version of the Mini-Moke
 Adobe Experience Manager, a suite of digital marketing software products
 Charles H. Dyson School of Applied Economics and Management (AEM) at Cornell University in Ithaca, New York
 Associate Emergency Manager®, a certification conferred by the International Association of Emergency Managers
 Automated efficiency model, a mathematical model used in real estate
 Aviation Electrician's Mate, a rating of the U.S. Navy

See also